Persepolis Shomal F.C. is an Iranian football club based in Qaem Shahr, Iran. They are a branch of Persepolis Tehran. They currently compete in the 3rd Division.

Season-by-Season
The table below chronicles the achievements of the club in various competitions since 2008. The club was renamed from Saipa Shomal to Persepolis Shomal in 2013 after it was purchased by Iranian football club Persepolis FC.

Coaching staff
 Ebrahim Talebi (Head coach)
 Pejman Jamshidi (Assistant coach)
 Salaedin Onagh (Goalkeeper coach)
 Mojtaba Rokni (Analyzer)
 Aref Mohammadkhani (Technical manager)

As of January 18, 2014

First Team Squad

References

External links
Official Website

Football clubs in Iran